S. S. Khandare is an Indian Police Service officer of 1995 batch, who is currently serving as Head of Police of Ladakh.

Career 
He has graduated from Govt College of Engineering, Pune in the year 1992. On October 31, Khandare appointed as the first "Head of Police" of the Union Territory of Ladakh when Ladakh became a Union Territory on 31 October 2019.

See also 
Director general of police

References 

Living people
Indian Police Service officers
Indian police chiefs
Year of birth missing (living people)